Malinówka may refer to the following places:
Malinówka, Łódź Voivodeship (central Poland)
Malinówka, Chełm County in Lublin Voivodeship (east Poland)
Malinówka, Podlaskie Voivodeship (north-east Poland)
Malinówka, Łęczna County in Lublin Voivodeship (east Poland)
Malinówka, Zamość County in Lublin Voivodeship (east Poland)
Malinówka, Subcarpathian Voivodeship (south-east Poland)
Malinówka, Masovian Voivodeship (east-central Poland)

See also 
 Malinovka (disambiguation)